Teacup in a Storm is a popular radio show in D100, and previously broadcast in Commercial Radio Hong Kong and Digital Broadcasting Corporation Hong Kong. It was modeled after CNN's Crossfire (TV series). This show discussed and aired grievances by callers about the government.  The name is a play on the English idiom "storm in a teacup".

It has been called one of the most influential radio talk shows in Hong Kong.

Past hosts included Allen Lee and Albert Cheng.

Further reading
 At the Epicentre: Hong Kong and the SARS Outbreak by Christine Loh, Hong Kong University Press (2004)
 Journalism and Democracy in Asia edited by Michael Bromley & Angela Romano, Routledge (2009)
 Media, Social Mobilisation and Mass Protests in Post-colonial Hong Kong by Francis L. F. Lee & Joseph M. Chan, Taylor & Francis (2010)
 Media in Hong Kong: Press Freedom and Political Change, 1967-2005 by Carol P. Lai, Taylor & Francis (2007)
 Attacks on the Press in 2004 by the committee to Protect Journalists, University of Michigan (2005)
 Freedom of the Press: A Global Survey of Media Independence, Rowman & Littlefield (2005)

References

Mass media in Hong Kong
Hong Kong radio programs
Current affairs shows